Zoo Kericho Football Club is a football club based in Kericho, Kenya. The club first participated in the Kenya Premier League in 2017, the highest level of the Kenyan football league system.

On 4 May 2021, Football Kenya Federation announced that the club had been relegated to Kenyan football second tier, National Super League, on allegations of match fixing.

Zoo FC play their home games at Green Stadium in Kericho town.

History
Zoo FC was formed in 2009 and joined the national league in 2010. The club has twice failed to earn promotion to the top tier on technical grounds. In 2014 the league awarded points to Shabana who, as a result, finished ahead of Zoo FC in the league table. In 2015, due to changes in the league structure no teams were relegated from the top tier Kenya Premier League. In 2017, Zoo FC was promoted to the Kenyan Premier League following an expansion of the top tier league to accommodate 18 teams.

References

External links
 

Kenyan National Super League clubs
FKF Division One clubs
Football clubs in Kenya
2009 establishments in Kenya
Association football clubs established in 2009